Basketball was one of the 14 sports disciplines held in the 1966 Asian Games in Bangkok, Thailand. Israel won their 1st title by beating host country in the championship match. This marked the first time the Philippines wasn't able to reach the semifinals. The games were held from 10 December to 19, 1966.

Medalists

Results

Preliminary round

Group A

Group B

Classification 9th–11th

Semifinals

9th place game

Classification 5th–8th

Semifinals

7th place game

5th place game

Final round

Semifinals

Bronze medal game

Gold medal game

Final standing

References
 Results

 
Basketball
1966
1966 in Asian basketball
International basketball competitions hosted by Thailand